Laurence Bradford Dakin (1904–1972) was a writer and poet born in Sandy Cove, Nova Scotia and lived throughout Europe, eventually moving to Laguna Hills, California where he died. His best known work was Marco Polo: A Drama in Four Acts (1946), which reported sold over 30, 000 copies in the United States and was hailed by John Masefield as the "work of a genius." Dakin was published by Obelisk Press. His wife was water colour painter Ilene Dakin (née Stitchbury).

References 

Artists from Nova Scotia
Writers from Nova Scotia
1904 births
1972 deaths
Canadian emigrants to the United States